We Are Not The Same is an EP released by Good Shoes in March 2006.

Track listing
 "We Are Not The Same" – 2:50
 "South West Trains" – 1:52
 "May Lannoye" – 2:51
 "Things To Make & Do" – 2:34

Good Shoes albums
2006 EPs